Eratap (also Waratap Island, Îlot Ératap, Castaway Island) is a small uninhabited island in the Pacific Ocean, a part of the Shefa Province of Vanuatu.

Geography
The island lies 7 km south of Port-Vila and has an upscale resort. The estimated terrain elevation above the sea level is some 10 meters

References

Islands of Vanuatu
Shefa Province
Uninhabited islands of Vanuatu